Gaia II may refer to

Gaia II (Valensia album) a 2000 album by Dutch musician Valensia
Gaia II: La Voz Dormida a 2005 album by Spanish folk metal group Mägo de Oz'